Brett Seney (born February 28, 1996) is a Canadian professional ice hockey forward currently playing for the Rockford IceHogs of the American Hockey League (AHL) while under contract to the Chicago Blackhawks of the National Hockey League (NHL). Seney was drafted by the New Jersey Devils 157th overall in the 2015 NHL Entry Draft.

Prior to turning professional, Seney played for Merrimack College where he was honoured as a Hockey East Third Team All-Star.

Playing career
Seney was selected 157th overall in the 2015 NHL Entry Draft by the New Jersey Devils. He was committed to play for Merrimack College in October 2015, but after a successful season with the Kingston Voyageurs he was asked to start a season earlier. In his sophomore, junior, and senior season at Merrimack College, Seney was named to the Hockey East All-Academic Team. In his senior year he was named to the Hockey East Third Team All-Star.

On March 16, 2018, at the conclusion of his senior season, Seney signed a two-year, entry-level contract with the Devils. He was assigned to the Devils American Hockey League team, the Binghamton Devils, for the 2018–19 season. On November 3, 2018, Seney made his NHL debut as the Devils lost 3–0 to the New York Islanders. On November 11, Seney recorded his first career NHL goal in a 5–2 loss to the Winnipeg Jets.

On July 29, 2021, Seney signed a one-year, two-way contract with the Toronto Maple Leafs.

At the conclusion of his contract with the Maple Leafs, Seney left as a free agent and signed a one-year, two-way contract with the Chicago Blackhawks on July 13, 2022.

Personal life
His older brother Joe attends the University of Oxford and plays for university's team in the British Universities Ice Hockey Association (BUIHA).

Career statistics

Awards and honours

References

External links
 

1996 births
Living people
Binghamton Devils players
Canadian ice hockey left wingers
Chicago Blackhawks players
Ice hockey people from Ontario
Merrimack Warriors men's ice hockey players
New Jersey Devils draft picks
New Jersey Devils players
Rockford IceHogs (AHL) players
Sportspeople from London, Ontario
Toronto Maple Leafs players
Toronto Marlies players